Milosav "Mija" Aleksić (26 September 1923 – 12 March 1995) was a Serbian actor.

Early life
Aleksić was born in the Gornja Crnuća village within the municipality of Gornji Milanovac, Kingdom of Serbs, Croats and Slovenes. During World War II, when Axis powers occupied the Kingdom of Yugoslavia, 17-year-old Mija Aleksić attended high school in Kragujevac. On 21 October 1941, as a retaliation to sporadic Partisan guerrilla attacks in the area, German occupational authorities committed one of the worst massacres in regional history (Kragujevac massacre) – shooting several thousand men and boys of Kragujevac, including entire high school classes. Mija Aleksić managed to escape and was one of the few surviving men of his generation in his native town.

Career

Aleksić initially enrolled in law school. But he gradually discovered a talent for acting. From the end of the war till 1948 he worked in Kragujevac theatre. In 1951 he joined the Yugoslav Drama Theatre in Belgrade, where he would stay until 1965. He then joined the National Theatre in Belgrade, where he stayed until retirement. Although notable for his drama talent, Aleksić is best known as a comedian. Additionally, he was one of the first actors in the Balkans whose career benefited from the new medium of television.

In the 1950s and 1960s, following the series of extremely popular sitcoms, he became one of the most popular entertainers of former Yugoslavia. Studio, the very first TV guide in history of the region, had his face on the cover its first issue in 1964. The popular TV sitcoms include Servisna Stanica (Car repair station), Ogledalo gradjanina Pokornog (The mirror of the citizen Pokorny) and others.

Aleksić had his own television show, Mija Show, and several episodes of this program have been preserved. He appeared in "Vaga za tačno merenje", an educational TV series for children. His popularity gradually declined, but he continued to work in the 1970s and 1980s. One of his last great roles was in the 1982 cult comedy The Marathon Family. His last film was Tango Argentino. Aleksić died in Belgrade in 1995, aged 71.

See also
 List of Yugoslavian films

References

External links
 

1923 births
1995 deaths
Serbian male stage actors
Serbian male television actors
People from Gornji Milanovac
Golden Arena winners
Laureates of the Ring of Dobrica
20th-century Serbian male actors
Burials at Belgrade New Cemetery